Paul Price (born 23 March 1954 St Albans, Hertfordshire) is a former professional footballer. He played for Welwyn Garden City, Luton Town, Tottenham Hotspur, Swansea City, Minnesota Strikers, Peterborough United, Saltash United, St Albans City and was an international for Wales. He played in the position of central defender.

Football career 
Price joined Luton Town from Welwyn Garden City in July 1971 and made 207 appearances for the club including one as substitute and scoring eight goals. In 1977 and 1978, Luton Town loaned Price to the Minnesota Kicks of the North American Soccer League. In June 1981 he transferred in a £250,000 deal to Spurs. He made his debut at Middlesbrough in August 1981. Price featured in both matches of the 1982 FA Cup Final and also played in the 1982 Football League Cup Final the same year. Making a total of 62 appearances in all competitions including four as sub and scoring one goal for the club. Price joined the Minnesota Strikers of the NASL in 1984 on a free transfer from Tottenham and then joined Swansea City in January 1985 and went on to make 62 League appearances for the club. He returned to England to play a further 86 times at Peterborough United, before finishing his career in non league with Saltash United, Chelmsford City, Wivenhoe Town and St Albans City.

International career
Price made a total of 27 appearances for Wales and scored once and was the first English born captain of Wales from 1982 to 1984.

Managerial career
Price was appointed manager of the Western Australian Football League team Western Knights in 2009. and later moved to coach Sorrento in 2011. Price recently took upon the role as manager of Armadale in 2015 – competing in NPL WA.

Post-football career 
After retiring from the game, Price went into property development before moving to Australia where he works in house renovation and property sales.

Honours 
Tottenham Hotspur
1981 FA Charity Shield: Winner (shared)
1982 FA Cup Final: Winner
1982 Football League Cup Final: Runner-up
UEFA Cup: 1983–84

References

External links
Tottenham Hotspur F.C A-Z of players Retrieved 4 December 2012 

Photo of Price
Welsh connection
NASL players
Spurs international players

Sportspeople from St Albans
1954 births
Living people
English footballers
English football managers
Luton Town F.C. players
Minnesota Kicks players
Minnesota Strikers (NASL) players
North American Soccer League (1968–1984) players
Peterborough United F.C. players
Swansea City A.F.C. players
Tottenham Hotspur F.C. players
Wales international footballers
Welwyn Garden City F.C. players
English Football League players
Saltash United F.C. players
Chelmsford City F.C. players
Wivenhoe Town F.C. players
St Albans City F.C. players
UEFA Cup winning players
Association football defenders
English expatriate sportspeople in the United States
English expatriate sportspeople in Australia
Expatriate soccer managers in Australia
Expatriate soccer players in the United States
English expatriate footballers
Welsh expatriate sportspeople in the United States
Welsh expatriate footballers
Welsh footballers
FA Cup Final players